Guzmania danielii is a plant species in the genus Guzmania. This species is native to Bolivia and Ecuador.

Cultivars
 Guzmania 'Zeus'

References

BSI Cultivar Registry Retrieved 11 October 2009

danielii
Flora of Bolivia
Flora of Ecuador